Philip Solomon Goodman (February 20, 1926 – May 2, 2015) was an American screenwriter, producer, and director. He was perhaps best known for directing the drama film We Shall Return (1963), starring Cesar Romero. He also wrote for television series such as Profiles in Courage, Danger, Alfred Hitchcock Presents, Rocky King Detective, and Johnny Staccato. He also directed plays at the Actors Studio.

Goodman was born in New York City to Flora and Solomon Goodman. He graduated from Brooklyn College and the University of Southern California (USC). He served in the U.S. Army from 1944 to 1946 during World War II. He was married to Evelyn Twersky and had two children, Nicholas, a producer, and Jody, a lawyer.

Goodman died on May 2, 2015 in New York City, aged 89.

References

External links
 

1926 births
2015 deaths
20th-century American dramatists and playwrights
American male dramatists and playwrights
United States Army personnel of World War II
American television writers
American male television writers
Film directors from New York City
University of Southern California alumni
Brooklyn College alumni
20th-century American male writers
Screenwriters from New York (state)